The 2021–22 WAC men's basketball season began with practices in October 2021 followed by the 2021–22 NCAA Division I men's basketball season in November 2021. The conference began play in December 2021. This is the WAC's 60th season of basketball. On July 1st, 2021, The WAC officially welcomed four new members: Abilene Christian, Lamar, Sam Houston, and Stephen F. Austin to grow and revitalize the conference. All four were previously in the Southland Conference. The WAC now has 6 full members in Texas, making it the largest DI conference in the state. Each WAC member will play an 18-game conference schedule. 

The WAC tournament was held March 9–12, 2022 at the Orleans Arena in Las Vegas, Nevada.

Pre-season

WAC Media days
The WAC's 2021 WAC media days were October 19-21, 2021 on the (WAC Digital Network).

The teams and representatives in respective order were as follows:

 UTRGV – Matt Figger (HC), Marek Nelson (F), Ricky Nelson (G)
 NM State - Chris Jans (HC), Johhny Mcants (F), Jabari Rice (G)
 Tarleton - Billy Gillispie (HC), Shakur Daniel (G), Freddy Hicks (G/F)
 Sam Houston - Jason Hooten (HC), Demarkus Lampley (G), Savion Flagg (G/F)
 Lamar - Alvin Brooks (HC), Kasen Harrison (G), Lincoln Smith (F)
 Abilene Chrisitan - Brette Tanner (HC), Coryon Mason (G), Reggie Miller (G)
 Seattle U - Jim Hayford (HC), Darrion Trammell (G), Riley Grigsby (G/F)
 Dixie State - Jon Judkins (HC), Cameron Gooden (G), Hunter Schofield (F)
 Chicago State - Gerald Gillion (HC), Bryce Johnson (G), Coreyoun Rushin (G)
 SFA - Kyle Keller (HC), Gavin Kensmil (F), Roti Ware (G), David Kachelries (G)
 Utah Valley - Mark Madsen (HC), Fardaws Aimaq (C), Trey Woodbury (G)
 California Baptist - Rick Croy (HC), Ty Rowell (G), Dan Akin (F)
 Grand Canyon - Bryce Drew (HC), Javon Blacksher (G), Gabe McGlothan (F)

Source:

Source:

WAC Preseason All-Conference
First Team

Second Team

Preseaon Player of the Year
Fardaws Aimaq

Regular season  
Before the season, the WAC announced a new media deal in which most regular season conference games games would be broadcast on ESPN+, with select regular season games and all conference tournament games airing on ESPN Linear Networks.

Early season tournaments

Records against other conferences
2021–22 records against non-conference foes through (December 29, 2021):

Regular Season

Record against ranked non-conference opponents
This is a list of games against ranked opponents only (rankings from the AP Poll):

Team rankings are reflective of AP poll when the game was played, not current or final ranking

† denotes game was played on neutral site

Conference schedule
This table summarizes the head-to-head results between teams in conference play.

Points scored

Through end of season

Rankings

Head coaches

Coaching changes
Many coaching changes were made during the offseason. UTRGV Coach Lew Hill shockingly died during the previous season on February 7, 2021. Jai Steadman then acted as interim head coach for the remainder of the season. Several months later, UTRGV announced Matt Figger as Hill's permanent replacement. Chicago State head coach Lance Irvin was fired in the offseason, posting a 7-54 overall record during his tenure. The Cougars tabbed Samford assistant coach Gerald Gillion to be their new head coach. Former Abilene Christian head coach Joe Golding left his position to take on a new position at UTEP, and his replacement was announced to be Brette Tanner, who was the associate head coach for ACU for 7 seasons. Lamar head coach Tic Price was fired shortly after the season ended, and Lamar hired Alvin Brooks, a former Lamar player himself, as their new head coach.

Coaches
Note: Stats shown are before the beginning of the season. Overall and WAC records are from time at current school.

Notes:
 Overall and WAC records, conference titles, etc. are from time at current school and are through the end the 2020–21 season.
 Records and season totals only include time spent at Division I as head coach.
 NCAA tournament appearances are from time at current school only.
 NCAA Final Fours and Championship include time at other schools.

Post season

WAC tournament

The conference tournament is scheduled to be played from March 9–12, 2022, at the Orleans Arena in Las Vegas, NV. However, the site for the first round of games has yet to be determined. Ten members will be invited to the tournament, with the top six seeds receiving at least one bye. Dixie and Tarleton are ineligible for the tournament until 2022-23 due to Division I transitions.

NCAA tournament

Teams from the conference that were selected to participate:

National Invitation Tournament 
Number from the conference that were selected to participate: 0

Awards and honors

Players of the week 
Throughout the conference regular season, the WAC offices name a player of the week, and a freshman of the week each Monday.

Totals per school - Players of the week

All-Americans

All-WAC 
First team

 ‡ WAC Player of the Year
 ‡‡ WAC Defensive Player of the Year

Second team

All-Newcomer team

† WAC Player of the Year & Newcomer of the Year

All-Defensive team

‡WAC Defensive Player of the Year

Other awards 
Sixth Man of the Year: Jaylin Jackson-Posey, Stephen F. Austin

Freshman of the Year: Taran Armstrong, California Baptist

Don Haskins Coach of the Year: Chris Victor, Seattle U

2022 NBA draft
No players from the Western Athletic Conference were drafted in the 2022 NBA Draft.

Home game attendance 

Bold – At or exceed capacity
†Season high
††Redhawk Center
‡Climate Pledge Arena
‡‡Bert Ogden Arena

References